Henry Lathrop may refer to:
 Henry A. Lathrop (1848–1911), American physician and politician
 Henry B. Lathrop (1808–1890), member of the Michigan Senate